Madhuca sarawakensis is a tree in the family Sapotaceae. The bark is greyish. Inflorescences bear up to 10 flowers. The tree is named after  Malaysia's Sarawak state. Its habitat is lowland mixed dipterocarp forest from sea level  to  altitude. M. sarawakensis is endemic to Borneo and restricted to Sarawak's Kuching Division.

References

sarawakensis
Endemic flora of Borneo
Trees of Borneo
Flora of Sarawak
Plants described in 1908